Michel Caffier (born 17 June 1930 in Boulogne-sur-Mer – 10 January 2021) was a French journalist, writer, and literary critic. He is the author of an abundant work centered on Lorraine: historical novels, essays and reference works, including the Dictionnaire des littératures de Lorraine.

Biography 
Caffier was a senior reporter and literary critic for L'Est Républicain, of which he was deputy chief editor. From 1986 to 2002, Caffier was the president of the jury who awards the yearly Prix Erckmann-Chatrian to a work written by a Lorrain or concerning Lorraine.

On January 10, 2021, Caffier died at age 90.

Distinctions 
  Prix littéraire des Conseils généraux de la Région Lorraine: winner in 1989, 1993 and 2001.

Works (selection) 
1985: L'Arbre aux pendus. Vie et misères de Jacques Callot,  Presses universitaires de Nancy
1990: L'Affaire de Nancy : pièce en sept tableaux, Nancy, Théâtre de la Manufacture, 6 mars, Presses universitaires de Nancy
1994: L'Académie Goncourt, Presses universitaires de France, Paris, 1994, series "Que sais-je?"
1994: Les frères Goncourt : un déshabillé de l'âme, Presses universitaires de Nancy
1998: Encyclopédie illustrée de la Lorraine. Art et littérature. Le théâtre en Lorraine, preface by Jack Lang, Éd. Serpenoise, Metz
2001: La deuxième vie de Léopold Poiré photographe, Metz 1879 - Nancy 1917, Éd. Pierron, Sarreguemines
2001: Les enfants du flot, Ed. Presses de la Cité
2003: Dictionnaire des littératures de Lorraine, Éd. Serpenoise, Metz, 2 vol., 1042 p.
2006: La Berline du roi Stanislas, Pocket, Paris
2007: Le TGV de 8 h 47 : quinze voyages littéraires en Lorraine, La Nuée bleue, Strasbourg
2007: L'Excelsior : un siècle d'art de vivre à Nancy, Éditions Place Stanislas, Nancy
2008: Au Panthéon des Dames de Lorraine. Sept destins de femmes de caractère, La Nuée bleue, Strasbourg
2012: , Presses de la Cité, Paris
2012: Petites histoires de la grande Lorraine : 50 avant J.-C.-2013, Éd. Serpenoise, Metz

References

External links 
 
 
 
 
 
 

1930 births
2021 deaths
20th-century French journalists
20th-century French writers
20th-century French male writers
21st-century French writers
French literary critics
People from Boulogne-sur-Mer
French male non-fiction writers